Kichijiya is a Japanese traditional oil company in Kofu City, Yamanashi Prefecture founded in 1568.

Products and services:

petroleum products
industrial lubricants
wholesale and retail trade of LPG
sales of food oil
sales of Italian foodstuffs
recruitment agency work of life insurance
solar photovoltaic system proposal sales
automobile maintenance and vehicle inspection etc.

See also 
List of oldest companies

References

External links 
Homepage in Japanese
Facebook page

Oil companies of Japan
Companies based in Yamanashi Prefecture
Companies established in the 16th century
1568 establishments in Japan